"I Want You So Bad" is a song recorded by American rock band Heart.  It was composed by Tom Kelly and Billy Steinberg, who were responsible for writing Heart's U.S. number-one single "Alone".  The track is a ballad sung by Ann Wilson, and was released in a remixed form as the fourth and final single from Heart's ninth studio album, Bad Animals, as well as being the band's final single of the 1980s.

"I Want You So Bad" did not duplicate the success of previous singles from the Bad Animals album, peaking at number 49 on the U.S. Billboard Hot 100 in early 1988.

Cash Box praised Ann Wilson's vocal performance and the production saying "Wilson here plays her voice like Eric Clapton plays the guitar, soulful - soaring at times to emotional and technical highs."

The '88 UK CD5 and 12" releases of "Nothin' At All" contain a single remix and extended remix, respectively, of "I Want You So Bad."

Chart performance

References

Heart (band) songs
1988 singles
Song recordings produced by Ron Nevison
Songs written by Tom Kelly (musician)
Songs written by Billy Steinberg
Hard rock ballads
1987 songs
1980s ballads